Otello Spampani (18 February 1918 – 1 May 1975) was an Italian sprinter. He competed in the men's 4 × 400 metres relay at the 1936 Summer Olympics.

References

External links
 

1918 births
1975 deaths
Athletes (track and field) at the 1936 Summer Olympics
Italian male sprinters
Olympic athletes of Italy
Place of birth missing